Aboyne Academy is a secondary school in Aboyne, Aberdeenshire, Scotland. The school is located on the Western side of the village and serves many other villages in the surrounding area, including: Braemar, Ballater, Kincardine O'Neil and Tarland. The catchment primary schools for Aboyne Academy are Aboyne, Ballater, Braemar, Crathie, Finzean, Kincardine O’Neil, Logie Coldstone, Lumphanan, Tarland and Torphins. As of September 2015, the school had 665 pupils, making it one of the smallest secondary schools in Aberdeenshire. Aboyne Academy offer their students multiple extra curricular activities ranging widely from sports to music to other opportunities for them to develop their skills.

Campus
The campus is situated on a wooded site, next to the A93 on the Western side of Aboyne. The main building contains a library,  a swimming pool, a theatre, a games hall and an all weather pitch in addition to the classrooms.

Extracurricular activities

Lost Project 
In 2011, the school began working with local and national archaeological groups in what is considered to be the largest school archaeology project in Scotland. The project involved a large number of first year pupils who performed a large archaeological survey at the site of former settlements in the Invercauld Estates called Auchtavan and Loin, which mostly abandoned during the 19th and early 20th century, though the last occupants left in the mid-1900s. From their work, the pupils created an exhibition at the nearby Breamar castle including a reconstruction of the inside of one of the houses. The pupils also created a short documentary which was shown at a local film festival.

Fundraising 
In 2011, Ella Egan (an English teacher at the school) retired - during her years at the school, she had coordinated local fundraising activities, raising almost £100,000 for Children in Need over a 23 year period. In 2013 many pupils took part in a sponsored walk from Burn o’ Vat to Aboyne as part of their yearly health week. The pupils raised money for their schools reporter club. In addition, to this many other events took place in health week including sports competitions and eating challenges.

Awards
In 2012 the school achieved the Eco-schools green flag. The award is given to a school that has improved the environment and raised environmental awareness in the local area.

References

External links
 
 Lost project website
Aberdeenshire Council Page

Secondary schools in Aberdeenshire
1974 establishments in Scotland
Educational institutions established in 1974